Haven was a supernatural drama television series loosely based on the Stephen King novel The Colorado Kid (2005). The show, which dealt with strange events in a fictional town in Maine named Haven, was filmed on the South Shore of Nova Scotia, and was an American/Canadian co-production. It starred Emily Rose, Lucas Bryant, Nicholas Campbell and Eric Balfour, whose characters struggle to help townspeople with supernatural afflictions and protect the town from the effects of those afflictions. The show was the creation of writers Jim Dunn and Sam Ernst.

The one-hour drama premiered on July 9, 2010, on Syfy, and concluded on December 17, 2015. In August 2015, Syfy canceled the series after five seasons.

Premise

When FBI Special Agent Audrey Parker (Emily Rose) is dispatched to the small town of Haven, Maine, on a routine case, she finds herself becoming increasingly involved in the return of "The Troubles", a plague of supernatural afflictions that have occurred in the town at least twice before. With an openness to the possibility of the paranormal, she also finds a more personal link in Haven that may lead her to the mother she has never known.

Over time, Parker, who eventually quits the FBI to join the Haven Police Department, begins to realize that her arrival in Haven may have been pre-arranged and that her name and even her memories may not be her own. As the series progresses, she learns more about the mysteries of both Haven and her true identity.

She and her partner, police detective Nathan Wuornos (Lucas Bryant), find themselves frequently facing problems caused by both the effects of the Troubles, as well as the activities of town folk who take more drastic measures against those who are Troubled.

Cast and characters

Main
 Emily Rose as Audrey Parker
 Lucas Bryant as Nathan Wuornos
 Nicholas Campbell as Garland Wuornos (season 1; guest seasons 2–3)
 Eric Balfour as Duke Crocker

Recurring

 Mary-Colin Chisholm as Eleanor Carr (season 1)
 Richard Donat as Vince Teagues
 John Dunsworth as Dave Teagues
 Anne Caillon as Jess Minion (season 1)
 Michelle Monteith as Julia Carr (season 1)
 Stephen McHattie as Edmund "Ed" Driscoll (season 2; guest season 1)
 Kathleen Munroe as FBI Agent Audrey Parker (season 2; cast season 1)
 Jason Priestley as Chris Brody (season 2; guest season 5)
 Vinessa Antoine as Evidence "Evi" Ryan (season 2)
 Adam "Edge" Copeland (credited as WWE Superstar Edge in seasons 2–3 and as Adam Copeland and WWE Superstar Edge in season 4–5) as Dwight Hendrickson (seasons 2–5)
 Maurice Dean Wint as Agent Byron Howard (season 3; guest seasons 1–2 & 5)
 Bree Williamson as Claire Callahan (season 3)
 Dorian Missick as Tommy Bowen (season 3)
 Kate Kelton as Jordan McKee (seasons 3–4)
 Steve Lund as James Cogan (season 3; guest season 5)
 Colin Ferguson as William (seasons 4–5)
 Emma Lahana as Jennifer Mason (season 4)
 Christian Camargo as Wade Crocker (season 4)
 Jayne Eastwood as Gloria Verrano (seasons 4–5)
 Robert Maillet (credited as Robert Norman Maillet in season 5) as Heavy (seasons 4–5)
 Kris Lemche as Seth Byrne (season 5; guest season 4)
 Laura Mennell as Charlotte Cross (season 5)
 Paul Braunstein as Mitchell (season 5)
 Christian (credited as WWE Superstar Christian) as McHugh (season 5)
 William Shatner as Croatoan (season 5)
 Rossif Sutherland as Henry (season 5)
 Tamara Duarte as Hailie Colton (season 5)

Development and production
Haven was originally developed for ABC Television in 2007 by writers Sam Ernst and Jim Dunn, with production company Piller Segan.

In September 2009, E1 Entertainment announced it was working with Stephen King to develop a television series based on his novel The Colorado Kid (2005). The entertainment company ordered the concept straight to series, with thirteen episodes planned. In November, Syfy announced it had acquired the series.

Sam Ernst and Jim Dunn wrote the pilot episode. According to Ernst, the original idea had no supernatural involvement, which prompted Stephen King to ask "Where's the supernatural element"? after he read their notes. In February 2010, Emily Rose was cast in the lead role of Audrey Parker.  Eric Balfour and Lucas Bryant came on board in late March. Canadian broadcaster Canwest Global Communications acquired rights to the series in March as well.

In April 2010, Adam Kane signed on to direct the pilot. Production began April 20 in Halifax, Nova Scotia and surrounding areas. Filming occurred primarily in Chester, Nova Scotia (including using the local arena as a studio) and throughout the South Shore of the province, including Lunenburg, Halifax, and Mahone Bay.

The promo of series premiere features the song Short Change Hero by The Heavy.

The series premiere, "Welcome to Haven", aired on Syfy in the U.S. on July 9, 2010, and on Showcase in Canada on July 12. The show became available to other international markets in October 2010.

Episodes

The one-hour drama premiered on July 9, 2010, on Syfy. The series was the first property to be produced for Syfy Pay channels around the globe, excluding Canada and Scandinavia. On October 12, 2011, it was renewed for a third 13-episode season, which began airing on September 21, 2012. On November 9, 2012, it was renewed for a fourth 13-episode season. On January 28, 2014, the show was renewed for a split 26-episode fifth season. The first half aired in 2014 with the second half airing in 2015.

Reception
Haven premiered to mixed reviews. On Metacritic season 1 has a score of 53 out of 100, based on reviews from 22 critics, indicating "mixed or average reviews". On Rotten Tomatoes season 1 has an approval rating of 35% based on reviews from 26 critics. The site's critical consensus stating: "It benefits from an intriguing setting and a strong lead in Emily Rose, but otherwise, Haven is a derivative supernatural crime procedural."

The Miami Heralds Glenn Garvin found it "barely competent" as a cop drama but "quite successful" as a "narrative of eccentric, slightly damaged yet ultimately warm characters". USA Todays Robert Bianco called it a "ludicrously see-through supernatural crime drama that wastes a perfectly fine performance from Emily Rose".

References to other works
Allusions to the written works of author Stephen King are made in the series regularly; the setting for the series is derived from King's novella The Colorado Kid (2005), although the name of the town is changed. On Syfy.com's Haven website, many of these references are explained for each episode. For example, Derry and Haven are both fictional towns in Maine previously used in the author's stories. One of the main characters receives a copy of a novel written by a character from King's novel, Misery (1987), while another character has just been released from Shawshank Prison. In some cases the plot of an episode revolves around an idea from King's works: a character who has precognitive, psychometric visions after touching people or things; or plants that start killing people.

It is noted on the Syfy site that "It is a particular favorite Stephen King book for the Haven writers and producers". For example, in "A Tale of Two Audreys", a little boy in a yellow rain slicker is seen outside the church chasing a newspaper boat that he has set in the stream in the gutter. He chases until it falls down into a storm drain on Witcham Street. He then sticks his right arm down into the drain and screams. The scene can be found in the opening chapter of the 1986 book. Also derived from It, the episode "Fear and Loathing" revolves around a troubled person who (unwillingly) takes the form of a person's worst fear, and in one instance appears as a clown, a visual allusion to Pennywise of the film version of It (1990).
The "Troubles" also seem to coincide with the arrival of the stranger, in this case Audrey, every 27 years. This is the same amount of time between appearances of the creature in It.

"Croatoan" coincidentally also appears carved into a tree in the 3 part Stephen King mini series "Storm of the Century."

Home media

DVD

Blu-ray
In Region A, Entertainment One released the first season on Blu-ray on June 14, 2011, and the second season on September 4, 2012. In Region B, the first season was released on September 14, 2011.

Broadcast
Haven has been sold for broadcast in several countries worldwide, including Australia, Canada, New Zealand, the United Kingdom, and the United States.

Syndication
Chiller acquired the rights to air Haven in June 2013. It first premiered on Sunday, July 14, 2013, at 8pm ET, and aired four episodes every Sunday thereafter until the series was discontinued prior to the network's closure.. Genesis International distributes the syndication version to several local markets in the US.

References

External links

 
 

 
2010 American television series debuts
2015 American television series endings
2010s American drama television series
2010 Canadian television series debuts
2015 Canadian television series endings
2010s Canadian drama television series
English-language television shows
Saturn Award-winning television series
Television shows based on works by Stephen King
Syfy original programming
Television shows filmed in Halifax, Nova Scotia
Television shows set in Maine
Showcase (Canadian TV channel) original programming
Television series by Entertainment One
Television series by Corus Entertainment
Television shows filmed in Nova Scotia
Television shows based on American novels
Canadian supernatural television series
2010s American crime drama television series
2010s Canadian crime drama television series